Catoptria conchella is a species of moth of the family Crambidae. It was described by Michael Denis and Ignaz Schiffermüller in 1775.

Subspecies
Catoptria conchella bourgognei Leraut, 2001
Catoptria conchella pseudopauperella (Zerny, 1914)

Distribution
This species can be found in Europe (Germany, Baltic region, Austria, France, Switzerland, Italy, Romania, Slovenia, Poland, Russia).

Habitat
These moths live in the alpine meadows up to 2200 m. They mainly occur in open, grassy areas.

Description
The wingspan is 24–30 mm. It is quite similar to Catoptria pinella, but the rear part of the front wing is paler and a subterminal line is missing.

Biology
Caterpillars can be found from April to June. Adults fly from June to August. These moths are crepuscular.

Bibliography
Amsel, Hans Georg; Gregor, František; Reisser, Hans (Hrsg.) (1965): Microlepidoptera Palaearctica. Band 1. Crambinae. Textteil. Verlag Georg Fromme & Co, Wien, S. 277
Bellmann, Heiko (2001): Steinbachs Naturführer. Schmetterlinge. Mosaik Verlag, München, 
Patrice Leraut: Zygaenids, Pyralids 1. In: Moths of Europe. 1. Auflage. Volume III. NAP Editions, 2012, S. 550.

References

Crambini
Moths described in 1775
Moths of Europe
Taxa named by Michael Denis
Taxa named by Ignaz Schiffermüller